The 1925 Idaho Vandals football team represented the University of Idaho in the 1925 Pacific Coast Conference football season, and were led by fourth-year head coach Robert L. Mathews. Home games were played on campus in Moscow at MacLean Field, with one in Boise at Public School Field.

Idaho defeated neighbor Washington State for the third straight year in the Battle of the Palouse, and the second consecutive win at Rogers Field in Pullman.

USC came north in late October and met Idaho in Moscow for the only time in history, and won 51–7 on a Friday afternoon. The next day in nearby Pullman, Washington State hosted Washington, decades before the rivalry became known as the Apple Cup. A special train from Boise brought up football fans from southern Idaho to watch both games for a package fare of fifty dollars for the four-day jaunt.

Idaho opened the season with three wins, but dropped its final five games. After the season, head coach Mathews left for Saint Louis University in Missouri and was succeeded by Charles Erb, a former all-PCC quarterback at the University of California.

Schedule

 The Little Brown Stein trophy for the Montana game debuted thirteen years later in 1938
 Two games were played on Friday (College of Idaho, USC) and one on Thursday (Creighton on Thanksgiving)

References

External links
Gem of the Mountains: 1926 University of Idaho yearbook – 1925 football season 
Go Mighty Vandals – 1925 football season
Scout.com: Idaho – Idaho vs. USC – The 1920s Series (Part III) and Part IV
Idaho Argonaut – student newspaper – 1925 editions

Idaho
Idaho Vandals football seasons
Idaho Vandals football